Shinya (Shin'ya) is a Japanese given name, usually for males.  It is pronounced as "Shin-ya", not "Shi-nya". Notable people with the name include:

, Japanese curler and curling coach
, Japanese politician
, professional mixed martial artist
, Japanese jazz drummer and composer
, Japanese voice actor
, professional wrestler
, Japanese judoka
, Japanese footballer
, Japanese professional baseball player
 Shinya Kimura, bike builder
, Japanese video game director and designer
, professional wrestler, known professionally as 
Shinya Matsuda, a voice actor
, professional Go player
, motorcycle racer
, a Japanese voice actor
, Japanese biathlete
 Shinya Sato (disambiguation), multiple people
, Japanese voice actor
, a video game producer
, Japanese swimmer
, film director and actor
, Japanese comedian and television presenter
, Japanese footballer
, Japanese footballer
, Japanese shogi player
, cell biologist
Shinya (Luna Sea musician) (born 1970), drummer of the band Luna Sea
Shinya (Dir En Grey musician) (born 1978), drummer of the band Dir En Grey

Fictional characters:
Shinya Aiba, Tekkaman Evil
Shinya Kogami, Psycho-Pass
Shinya Hiragi, Owari no Seraph
Shinya Oda, Persona 5

Shinya or Shin'ya (written:  or ) is also a Japanese surname. Notable people with the surname include:

, Japanese speed skater
, Japanese swimmer

Japanese-language surnames
Japanese masculine given names